Dheri Thothal is a village in the Mirpur Tehsil of Mirpur District of Azad Kashmir, Pakistan.

Demography 

According to the 1998 census of Pakistan, its population was 2,013.

References 

Populated places in Mirpur District